Adama Diatta (born 14 August 1988) is a male freestyle wrestler from Senegal. He participated in the Men's freestyle 55 kg at the 2008 Summer Olympics. In the round of 16, he lost to Tomohiro Matsunaga from Japan. In the repechage round, he was beaten by Turkish Sezar Akgul.

He competed for Senegal at the 2016 Summer Olympics in the 57 kg division. He was defeated by Yowlys Bonne of Cuba in the first round. He was the flag bearer for Senegal during the closing ceremony.

Through the 2021 African & Oceania Wrestling Olympic Qualification Tournament, he earned qualification to represent Senegal at the 2020 Summer Olympics in Tokyo, Japan.

References

External links 
 
 
 
 

1988 births
Living people
Senegalese male sport wrestlers
Olympic wrestlers of Senegal
Wrestlers at the 2008 Summer Olympics
Wrestlers at the 2016 Summer Olympics
Wrestlers at the 2020 Summer Olympics
African Games medalists in wrestling
African Games gold medalists for Senegal
Competitors at the 2007 All-Africa Games
Competitors at the 2015 African Games
20th-century Senegalese people
21st-century Senegalese people